Club Social Cultural y Deportivo Muñiz is an Argentine sports club from Muñiz, San Miguel Partido in Gran Buenos Aires. The football team currently plays in Primera D Metropolitana, the fifth division of the Argentine football league system.

Apart from football, the club also has a volleyball section.

History

The club was first affiliated with AFA in 1954 for a ten-year period. Muñiz returned to participate in AFA tournaments in 1979, and in 1981 obtained its first promotion to Primera C after winning "Torneo Reducido" (a tournament contested by the best placed teams after champion Barracas Central).

Muñiz would after win the Primera D championship in 1986–87, being its only title to date.

Muñiz has been disaffiliated a total of seven times (1964, 1990–91, 1994–95, 2001–02, 2005–06, 2007–08 and most recently in 2010–11 season). It has been playing AFA tournaments continuously since the 2011–12 season.

Stadium
The club has an own stadium but its degree of deterioration caused the venue was closed in 1986 until it be refurbished. Meanwhile, Muñiz plays its home games at the Estadio Ciudad de San Miguel, venue of rival team Juventud Unida, and at Club Atlético San Miguel's stadium.

Team 20189-20
 NOVEMBER, 24 of 2019.

Titles
 Primera D (1): 1986-87

References

External links
 

Association football clubs established in 1932
Football clubs in Buenos Aires Province
San Miguel Partido
1932 establishments in Argentina